Mohammad Ghaseminejad (born March 5, 1989) is an Iranian footballer who plays as a midfielder who currently plays for Iranian club Padideh in the Persian Gulf Pro League.

His cousin Amin is also a footballer.

Honours
Foolad
Hazfi Cup: 2020–21
Iranian Super Cup: 2021

References

External links 
 Mohammad Ghaseminejad on instagram
 Mohammad Ghaseminejad at Soccerway

Living people
1989 births
Association football midfielders
Iranian footballers
Sanat Naft Abadan F.C. players
Nassaji Mazandaran players
Shahr Khodro F.C. players
Foolad FC players
Sanat Mes Kerman F.C. players
Persian Gulf Pro League players
People from Babol
Sportspeople from Mazandaran province